King's Road is a major east–west road along the north of Hong Kong Island, Hong Kong, stretching from Causeway Bay (Tin Hau), where it joins Causeway Road, to Sai Wan Ho, where it joins Shau Kei Wan Road.

History
Originally part of the Shaukiwan Road, it was renamed in 1935 in honour of the Silver Jubilee of King George V's reign.

Features
From West to East.
In Tin Hau:
 No. 1: Park Towers
In North Point:
 No. 238-240: Fortress Towers and C&MA North Point Church
 No. 277-291: Former State Theatre
 No. 423: Sunbeam Theatre
 Note that The boundary between North Point and Quarry Bay is at Man Hong Street / Healthy Street West
In Quarry Bay:
 No. 611: WSD Hong Kong Regional Building
 No. 668-702: Healthy Village
 No. 740-774: Model Housing Estate
 No. 888: North Point Government Primary School
 No.979-981: Taikoo Place
 No. 986: The Former Quarry Bay School is a Grade III historic building. Currently vacant, it was built in 1924–1926.
 No. 1032-1044: Fook Cheong Building
 No. 1048-1056: Yick Fat Building. Housing the Hong Kong Aquarium Plaza.
 No. 1111: Cityplaza

Traffic
The road is shared between automobile traffic and the Hong Kong Tramways system, and the east bound of the section between eastern Causeway Bay and Quarry Bay bus lane. This tram line runs between Shau Kei Wan to Kennedy Town. Before the opening of Island Eastern Corridor and Island line of the MTR in the 1980s, the road was plagued with traffic congestion. Various measures like creation of bus lanes were taken to address the problem.

Part of the MTR Island line runs underneath the road, and the following stations serve the Road: Tin Hau (exit A1), Fortress Hill (exits A and B), North Point (exits B1/B2/B3), Quarry Bay (exit A), Tai Koo.

See also
 List of streets and roads in Hong Kong

References

External links

Google Maps of King's Road 

Roads on Hong Kong Island
Causeway Bay
North Point
Quarry Bay
Sai Wan Ho